Dolichoderus obliteratus is an extinct species of Miocene ant in the genus Dolichoderus. Described by Samuel Hubbard Scudder in 1877, only a fossilised wing of the species was found in Canada.

References

†
Miocene insects
Fossil taxa described in 1877
†
Fossil ant taxa